Rieppeleon is a genus of small, typically brown chameleons found in forests and savannas in central East Africa (extending slightly into adjacent DR Congo). They are found at low levels in bushes, or on the ground among grass or leaf litter.

Etymology
The genus Rieppeleon was named after Swiss-born American herpetologist Olivier Rieppel (born 1951).

The specific name, kerstenii, is in honor of German chemist and geographer Otto Kersten (1839–1900).

The subspecific name, robecchii, is in honor of Italian geologist and explorer Luigi Robecchi Bricchetti (1855–1926).

Taxonomy
Until recently, the species in the genus Rieppeleon were commonly included in the genus Rhampholeon instead.

Species and subspecies
The following species and subspecies are recognized as being valid.

Nota bene: A binomial authority, or trinomial authority, in parentheses indicates that the species, or subspecies, was originally described in a genus other than Rieppeleon.

References

Further reading
 (Rieppeleon, new genus, p. 1673).

 
Lizards of Africa
Lizard genera
Taxa named by Colin R. Tilbury